Nate Carroll (born March 24, 1987) is an American football coach who is currently the senior offensive assistant for the Seattle Seahawks of the National Football League (NFL). He has spent his career working for his father Pete, the head coach and executive vice president of the Seahawks.

Playing career 
A three-star sport athlete in high school, Carroll was recruited mostly by small schools including San Diego, then coached by Jim Harbaugh. Carroll did not intend to play college football and opted to enroll at the University of Southern California, where his father was coaching. He graduated from USC in 2010 with a degree in psychology.

Coaching career
Unsure of what he wanted to do following graduation, the younger Carroll was offered a job by his father to work for the Seattle Seahawks as a personnel assistant in the scouting department for one season before being named a defensive assistant in 2011. Initially offered a coaching position in Jacksonville by former Seahawks defensive coordinator and newly hired head coach Gus Bradley, Carroll was shifted to offensive assistant in 2013. He was a member of the coaching staff that defeated the Denver Broncos in Super Bowl XLVIII, giving Carroll his first Super Bowl victory. He was promoted to assistant wide receivers coach in 2014, working with Kippy Brown and later Dave Canales. Carroll served as the team's wide receivers coach from 2018 to 2021.

Personal life 
Carroll's father is Pete Carroll and his brother Brennan is currently the offensive coordinator at Arizona. Carroll and his wife Anna have two sons.

References

External links 
 Seattle Seahawks bio

1987 births
Living people
Sportspeople from Edina, Minnesota
Sportspeople from Los Angeles
Coaches of American football from Minnesota
Coaches of American football from California
University of Southern California alumni
Seattle Seahawks coaches